Board of Investment or BOI may refer to:

 Board of Investment (Mauritius) - investment promotion agency of Mauritius
 Board of Investment (Sri Lanka)- investment promotion agency of Sri Lanka
 Thailand Board of Investment - investment promotion agency of Thailand
 Pakistan Board of Investment - investment promotion agency of Pakistan